Agha Hasan Abedi, (14 May 1922 – 5 August 1995) was a Pakistani banker and convicted felon who founded Bank of Credit and Commerce International (BCCI) and saw its collapse after one of the biggest banking fraud scandals in history was unearthed. Before his death, he was convicted by the United Arab Emirates court for fraud and was sentenced for eight years in prison. Abedi also founded United Bank Limited. Abedi underwent a heart transplant operation in 1988, and died of a heart attack on 5 August 1995 in Karachi.

Early life and education

Agha Hasan Abedi was born in Lucknow, British India, to a middle class family with members who served as advisors and courtiers to the Nawab of Awadh. He received his master's degree in English literature and a law degree from Lucknow University. Abedi migrated to Pakistan after the creation of Pakistan in 1947.

Career 
Abedi started his career at the age of 24 when he joined Habib Bank Limited.

In 1959, Abedi founded the United Bank Limited (UBL). He was the Founder and the first President. Under his stewardship, UBL became the second largest bank in Pakistan. Abedi introduced the concept of personalised service and banking support to trade and industry, paying particular attention to the bank's overseas operations. One of the first to comprehend the opportunities offered by the oil boom in the Persian Gulf, Abedi pioneered close economic collaboration in the private sector between Pakistan and the United Arab Emirates (UAE). The UAE President, Sheikh Zayed bin Sultan Al Nahyan, extended his patronage to UBL operations both in Pakistan and abroad.

Bank of Credit and Commerce International 
In 1972, Abedi started the Bank of Credit and Commerce International (BCCI) initially with funding of  only. For a decade, it was the fast growing bank in the world. At its peak, it operated in more than seventy countries and had about 1.3 million depositors.

In 1988, he left because of poor health.

In July 1991, it was found by international regulators that the bank was involved in a massive fraud and money laundering for Colombian drug cartels, Abu Nidal Organization, and Central Intelligence Agency. Subsequently, its assets were seized.

Registered in Luxembourg, the BCCI began its operations from a two-room head office in London. It developed into a worldwide banking operation with branches in 72 countries and 16,000 employees. Abedi was personally responsible for inducing a large number of Pakistanis into the field of international banking and almost 80 per cent of the BCCI's top executive positions at the head office and in branches in various countries were held by Pakistanis. "It was founded by the charismatic Agha Hasan Abedi in 1972, backed by Middle Eastern investors and run mostly by the South Asians." Abedi severed his connection with BCCI in 1990 after suffering a heart attack and led a retired life in Karachi until his death due to heart failure at Aga Khan University Hospital, Karachi in 1995.

Philanthropy 

Abedi founded charitable organisations in UK, India, Bangladesh, Zimbabwe and Pakistan.

The Infaq Foundation has only one office in Karachi, Pakistan. It has capital and reserves of over Rs. 2.50 billion, which in 2009 is equivalent to just over US$30 million. Major beneficiaries among the known institutions are, Sindh Institute of Urology and Transplantation, National Institute of Cardiovascular Diseases, Lady Dufferin Hospital and Sir Syed University of Engineering and Technology in Karachi, and Ghulam Ishaq Khan Institute of Engineering Sciences and Technology in Topi, Khyber Pakhtunkhwa, Pakistan. Ghulam Ishaq Khan was the first Chairman of the Foundation from 1983 to 1995.

Abedi also founded BCCI FAST in 1980 with a donation of Rs. 100 million, to promote education in computer science. It is now the first multi-campus university of Pakistan, known as National University of Computer and Emerging Sciences. It has five campuses situated in Islamabad, Peshawar, Karachi, Lahore and Faisalabad.

Abedi also contributed funds to establish Ghulam Ishaq Khan Institute of Engineering Sciences and Technology.

Personal life
Hasan Abedi was married to Rabia Abedi. The couple had a daughter named Maha. Although Abedi was born into a Shia Muslim family, he was a well-known Muslim mystic. During his speeches at the meetings of the BCCI Bank, he would spend hours sharing his mystical beliefs. He believed that BCCI was not only a bank, but a god-gifted entity that was directly connected to the universe.

Award and honor
Agha Hasan Abedi Auditorium at Ghulam Ishaq Khan Institute of Engineering Sciences and Technology, Swabi, Khyber Pakhtunkhwa, Pakistan, was named after him.
 Agha Hasan Abedi was posthumously awarded the Hilal-i-Imtiaz, a Pakistani Civilian Award, by the President of Pakistan in 2015 for his services to the nation.

References

External links
Biographical
Agha Hasan Abedi, Salaam
Agha Hasan Abedi passes away, Dawn wire service
About BCCI
The BCCI Affair, Federation of American Scientists (www.fas.org)

CDSS – Centre for Development of Social Services
CDSS, Centre for Development of Social Services – Official Website
Korangi Academy, Korangi Academy – Official Website

Misc.
About Foundation for Advancement of Science and Technology (FAST), National University
Genesis, GIK Institute

1922 births
1995 deaths
Pakistani bankers
Pakistani white-collar criminals
Pakistani philanthropists
Businesspeople from Lucknow
Muhajir people
Businesspeople from Karachi
Pakistani financiers
Recipients of Hilal-i-Imtiaz
Heart transplant recipients
Pakistani fraudsters
People convicted of money laundering
Fugitives wanted on fraud charges
A
Pakistani money launderers
20th-century philanthropists
People convicted of fraud
Fugitives wanted by the United States